Everett Sanipass (born February 13, 1968) is a Canadian retired ice hockey forward. Sanipass was born in Elsipogtog First Nation, New Brunswick. Sanipass is the first Native Canadian to be inducted into the New Brunswick Sports Hall of Fame.

Playing career
Sanipass began his National Hockey League career with the Chicago Blackhawks in 1987 after being drafted 14th overall in the 1986 NHL Entry Draft. His indigenous heritage as a Mi'kmaq caused him to face racism early in his hockey career since he was prohibited from playing on off-reserve teams. Sanipass was the first native draft pick out of New Brunswick. His tally of forty-three goals and twenty-six assists in only thirty-seven games while playing in the New Brunswick Amateur Hockey Association drawing considerable attention. Sanipass spent 2 seasons with the Chicago Blackhawks before being traded to the Quebec Nordiques.

In 1987, Sanipass was a member of the Canadian U20 Team. Sanipass became famous for his role in the 1987 World Junior Hockey Championship brawl (Punch-up in Piestany) that took place between Canada and the Soviet Union. Both teams left the bench, prompting the referees, who were unable to stop the fighting, to leave the ice surface for their own safety. Officials even tried to turn off the lights with the hopes of causing the players to be so concerned with their own safety that they would stop fighting.  Both teams were ultimately kicked out of the tournament for their unsportsmanlike behaviour.

Later in his career, Sanipass would leave the NHL and play for the Halifax Citadels from 1991 to 1993. He would retire from the NSJHL East Hants Penguins in 1995.

Career statistics

Regular season and playoffs

International

References

External links

1968 births
Living people
20th-century First Nations people
Canadian ice hockey left wingers
Chicago Blackhawks draft picks
Chicago Blackhawks players
First Nations sportspeople
Granby Bisons players
Halifax Citadels players
Ice hockey people from New Brunswick
Indianapolis Ice players
Mi'kmaq people
National Hockey League first-round draft picks
People from Kent County, New Brunswick
Quebec Nordiques players
Saginaw Hawks players
Verdun Junior Canadiens players